David Richards is an Australian and former CEO of the Australian Cricket Board from 1980 to 1993 and  CEO of International Cricket Council from 1993 to 2001, Malcolm Speed took over as CEO..

References

Year of birth missing (living people)
Living people
Australian cricket administrators
Australian chief executives
Place of birth missing (living people)